Hilarographa parambae is a species of moth of the family Tortricidae. It is found in Ecuador.

The wingspan is about 16 mm. The ground colour of the forewings is orange cream and cream in the costal area. The hindwings are cream orange, but brownish terminally and orange brown in the anal area.

Etymology
The species name refers to the type locality.

References

Moths described in 2009
Hilarographini